Chaize may refer to:

 Patrick Chaize (born 1963), French senator
 Château de la Chaize, a French chateau
 La Chaize-Giraud, a French commune
 La Chaize-le-Vicomte, a French commune

See also 
 Chaise (disambiguation)